Alexander Wennberg (born 22 September 1994) is a Swedish professional ice hockey player for the Seattle Kraken of the National Hockey League (NHL). He previously played for the Columbus Blue Jackets and Florida Panthers. He was drafted by the Blue Jackets in the first round, 14th overall, of the 2013 NHL Entry Draft. Before joining the NHL, Wennberg played professionally in the Swedish Hockey League.

Playing career
For the 2010–11 season, Wennberg joined the Djurgårdens IF under-18 team, scoring 11 goals and 23 assists. The next year, he moved up to the organization's under-20 team and also represented Sweden at the 2011 U19 World Junior A Challenge and 2012 U18 World Junior Championship tournaments. He also spent time with Djurgårdens IF's Elitserien senior team but did not appear in any games.

Wennberg was ranked fifth out of all 2013 NHL Entry Draft eligible European skaters and was ultimately selected 14th overall by the Columbus Blue Jackets at the 2013 NHL Entry Draft. In May 2014, he signed a three-year, entry level contract with the Blue Jackets. Upon joining the Blue Jackets, Wennberg was given the jersey number 41 which he switched in his second season.

Wennberg made his NHL debut on October 9, 2014 against the Buffalo Sabres, where he also recorded his first NHL point. He was reassigned to Columbus' American Hockey League (AHL) affiliate, the Springfield Falcons, after playing in seven NHL games, as defenceman Ryan Murray was activated off injured reserve. However, he was recalled to Columbus the next day after the team placed Matt Calvert on injured reserve. Wennberg scored his first career NHL goal on 22 December in a 5–1 loss to the Nashville Predators.

Wennberg missed the first five games of the 2015–16 season to recover from a concussion he suffered during the Blue Jackets' season opener against the New York Rangers. After returning, Wennberg was again injured in early November and was subsequently placed on injured reserve.

The following season, Wennberg played in 80 regular season games and recorded career-highs in goals (13) and assists (46). On September 1, 2017, he signed a new six-year, $29.4 million contract with the Blue Jackets carrying an annual salary cap hit of $4.9 million.

During the first game of the 2018 Stanley Cup playoffs, Wennberg was injured by a check from Washington Capitals forward Tom Wilson and was removed from the game. Due to this, the Blue Jackets earned a power play which Columbus scored on to tie the game. The Blue Jackets went on to win the game in overtime. Wennberg played two more games in the series but the Blue Jackets failed to advance.

On October 8, 2020, Wennberg was placed on waivers for the purpose of buying out the remaining three years on his contract. On the opening day of free agency, Wennberg was signed by the Florida Panthers to a one-year, $2.25 million contract on October 9, 2020. He was signed by newly installed GM Bill Zito, who was formerly a part of the Blue Jackets organization. In a fresh start with the Panthers, in which the pandemic delayed and shortened the  season, Wennberg responded with a career high 17 goals in 56 games, and added 12 assists while relied upon to provide responsible two-way play.

As a free agent from the Panthers, Wennberg was targeted and signed to a three-year, $13.5 million contract with the expansion club, the Seattle Kraken, on July 28, 2021.

Career statistics

Regular season and playoffs

International

References

External links
 

1994 births
Living people
Columbus Blue Jackets draft picks
Columbus Blue Jackets players
Djurgårdens IF Hockey players
Florida Panthers players
Frölunda HC players
National Hockey League first-round draft picks
Seattle Kraken players
Springfield Falcons players
Swedish ice hockey centres
People from Nacka Municipality
Sportspeople from Stockholm County